The 1995 Nippon Professional Baseball season was the 46th season of operation for the league.

Regular season standings

Central League

Pacific League

Japan Series

See also
1995 Major League Baseball season

References

 
1995 in baseball
1995 in Japanese sport